Javier De Frutos is a Spanish director, choreographer and designer (born in Caracas, Venezuela in 1963) was named by the Evening Standard as one of 2016 most influential people in London.

He is one of only three artists in the history of the Olivier Awards to have received nominations in all of the dance categories. His awards include the Olivier Award for Best Theatre Choreography for Cabaret, The Evening Standard Award for The Most Incredible Thing in collaboration with Pet Shop Boys, Critics' Circle Awards for Milagros with Royal New Zealand Ballet and Elsa Canasta with Rambert and Scottish Ballet, The South Bank Show Award for Grass and The Time Out Award for Sour Milk with Candoco Dance Company. 

Further credits include the National Theatre production of London Road - winner of the Critics Circle Award for Best Musical and for which he received an Olivier nomination for the stage version and The Chita Rivera Award for best choreography in a feature film for the screen adaptation. His work Fiction for BalletBoyz was named Best of Dance by The Arts Desk and Top 10 by the Guardian in 2016. From Here to Eternity, the Tim Rice musical which he premiered on the West End, was nominated for the WhatsOnStage award for Best Choreography and The Anatomy of a Passing Cloud for Royal New Zealand Ballet was nominated for both an Olivier Award and a National Dance Award.

He has received further recognition in the field of music video with a nomination for best choreography in the UK music Video awards for his collaboration with Jake Nava in Delilah’s Inside My Love and also received the Prix de Auteur in the 1996 Concours de Seine-Saint Denis in Paris.

His work has been the subject of several documentaries. The South Bank Show in 1998 dedicated an hour king feature. Only a handful of dance artists have received that honour.

In 2011 the BBC broadcast The Most Incredible Thing in prime time  in collaboration with Pet Shop Boys, and the US premiere took place in Charlotte North Carolina earlier this year.

In 2018 he was invited to be and Artist in Residence at the McColl Center for Art and Innovation, the first Choreographer and Director to be so honored in their 20 year History. In 2000 De Frutos became one of the first Fellowship recipients The Arts Council of England, through which he studied extensively the works of Tennessee Williams for more than two years. He also represented Britain at the internationally prestigious Venice Biennale in 2006.

References

 
Guardian profile
The Independent profile
Time Out interview

External links
 

1963 births
Living people
Venezuelan choreographers
Venezuelan male dancers
Laurence Olivier Award winners
National Dance Award winners
People from Caracas